The 1995–96 Dallas Stars season was the third National Hockey League season in Dallas, Texas (and 29th as a franchise), which would start off badly and finish badly, with a division worst 26-42-14. The Stars failed to qualify for the playoffs for the first time since 1993 when they were known as the Minnesota North Stars.

Offseason

Regular season
On March 11, 1996, the Stars played in the final game at the Montreal Forum.

Final standings

Schedule and results

Player statistics

Regular season
Scoring

Goaltending

Note: Pos = Position; GP = Games played; G = Goals; A = Assists; Pts = Points; +/- = plus/minus; PIM = Penalty minutes; PPG = Power-play goals; SHG = Short-handed goals; GWG = Game-winning goals
      MIN = Minutes played; W = Wins; L = Losses; T = Ties; GA = Goals-against; GAA = Goals-against average; SO = Shutouts; SA = Shots against; SV = Shots saved; SV% = Save percentage;

Awards and honors

Draft picks
Dallas's draft picks at the 1995 NHL Entry Draft held at the Edmonton Coliseum in Edmonton, Alberta.

References
 Stars on Hockey Database

D
D
Dallas Stars seasons

hu:A Dallas Stars 1994–1995-ös szezonja